Cannelton may refer to:

Places
Cannelton, Indiana, a city in Troy Township, Perry County, Indiana, United States
Cannelton Historic District, a National Historic District in Cannelton, Indiana, United States
Cannelton, Pennsylvania, an unincorporated community in Darlington Township, Beaver County, Pennsylvania, United States
Cannelton, West Virginia, an unincorporated community in Fayette County, West Virginia, United States

Other
Cannelton Cotton Mill, also known as Indiana Cotton Mill, a National Historic Landmark in Cannelton, Indiana, United States
Cannelton High School, a school in Cannelton, Indiana, United States
Cannelton Locks and Dam, a dam with two locks on the Ohio River in the United States